Colin Cameron may refer to:

Colin Cameron (Canadian politician) (1896–1968), Canadian Member of Parliament
Colin Cameron (footballer) (born 1972), Scottish football player
Colin Cameron (Malawian politician), Member of the Legislative Council and minister in Malawi
Colin Stewart Cameron, politician and lawyer in Ontario, Canada
A. Colin Cameron (born 1956), Australian econometrician